Chlorophthalic anhydride may refer to:

 3-Chlorophthalic anhydride
 4-Chlorophthalic anhydride